Estadio Santo Domingo is the name of:

 Estadio Municipal de Santo Domingo, in Alcorcón, Spain
 Estadio Municipal Santo Domingo, in El Ejido, Spain
 Estadio Olímpico Félix Sánchez, in Santo Domingo, Dominican Republic